The 2008 congressional elections in Massachusetts were held on November 4, 2008, to determine who will represent the U.S. state of Massachusetts in the United States House of Representatives. Representatives are elected for two-year terms; whoever is elected will serve in the 111th Congress from January 4, 2009, until January 3, 2011. The election coincides with the 2008 U.S. presidential election.

Massachusetts has ten seats in the House, apportioned according to the 2000 United States Census. Its 2007-2008 congressional delegation consisted of ten Democrats. This remains unchanged, and CQ Politics had forecasted all districts safe for its Democratic incumbent.

Overview

District 1

 covers roughly the northwest half of the state. It has been represented by Democrat John Olver since June, 1991. CQ Politics forecasted the race as 'Safe Democrat'.

District 2

 lies in the south-central part of the state. It has been represented by Democrat Richard Neal since 1989. CQ Politics forecasted the race as 'Safe Democrat'.

District 3

 lies in the central and southeastern part of the state. It has been represented by Democrat Jim McGovern since 1997. CQ Politics forecasted the race as 'Safe Democrat'.

District 4

 lies in the southern part of the state,  including the South Coast region. It has been represented by Democrat Barney Frank since 1981. CQ Politics forecasted the race as 'Safe Democrat'.

District 5

 lies in the north-east part of the state. It has been represented by Democrat Niki Tsongas since October, 2007. CQ Politics forecasted the race as 'Safe Democrat'.

District 6

 covers the north-east corner of the state. It has been represented by Democrat John Tierney since 1997. CQ Politics forecasted the race as 'Safe Democrat'.

District 7

 lies in the eastern part of the state, including some Boston suburbs. It has been represented by Democrat Edward J. Markey since 1976. CQ Politics forecasted the race as 'Safe Democrat'.

District 8

 lies in the eastern part of the state, including part of Boston and the immediately adjacent cities of Cambridge, Somerville, and Chelsea. It has been represented by Democrat Mike Capuano since 1999. CQ Politics forecasted the race as 'Safe Democrat'.

District 9

 lies in the eastern part of the state, including part of Boston and some of its southern suburbs. It has been represented by Democrat Stephen Lynch since October 2001. CQ Politics forecasted the race as 'Safe Democrat'.

District 10

 covers the south-east part of the state, including parts of the South Shore and all of Cape Cod and The Islands. It has been represented by Democrat Bill Delahunt since 1997. CQ Politics forecasted the race as 'Safe Democrat'.

References

External links
Elections from the Massachusetts Secretary of the Commonwealth
U.S. Congress candidates for Massachusetts at Project Vote Smart
Massachusetts U.S. House Races from 2008 Race Tracker
Campaign contributions for Massachusetts congressional races from OpenSecrets

2008
Massachusetts
United States House of Representatives